Val Andrews (15 February 1926 – 12 December 2006) was a music hall artist, ventriloquist, and writer.

Andrews was born in Hove, Sussex, England a few hours after Valentine's Day, hence his name. Son of an architect, he was introduced to magic by his father. Andrews was a prolific writer on magic, having published over 1000 books and booklets from 1952. He also authored Sherlock Holmes pastiches and Houdini's novels. He lived for a number of years in Brighton, then in London (from 1943 onwards) where he joined the London Society of Magicians.

Awards
 The John Nevil Maskelyne Prize (2000)

Bibliography

Autobiography
 Dedicated Magic  (1971)
Four seasons in the life of Val Andrews (1984)

Sherlock Holmes novels
Sherlock Holmes and the Eminent Thespian (1988)
Sherlock Holmes and the Brighton Pavilion Mystery (1989)
Sherlock Holmes and the Egyptian Hall Adventure (1993)
Sherlock Holmes and the Houdini Birthright (1995)
Sherlock Holmes and the Yule-tide Mystery (1996)
Sherlock Holmes and the Man Who Lost Himself (1996)
Sherlock Holmes and the Baker Street Dozen (1997)
Sherlock Holmes and the Circus of Fear (1997)
Sherlock Holmes and the Greyfriars School Mystery (1997)
Sherlock Homes and the Theatre of Death (1997)
Sherlock Holmes and the Sandringham House Mystery (1998)
Sherlock Holmes and the Tomb of Terror (1999)
Sherlock Holmes on the Western Front (1999)
Sherlock Holmes at the Varieties (1999)
The Torment of Sherlock Holmes (1999)
Sherlock Holmes and the Longacre Vampire (2000)
Sherlock Holmes and the Holborn Emporium (2001)
Sherlock Holmes and the Secret Seven (2001)
The Ghost of Baker Street (2006)
The Prince of Ventriloquists: Another Case for Sherlock Holmes (2006)
Sherlock Holmes and the Charlie Chaplin Affair (2020)

References

External links
Val Andrews at Fantastic Fiction

1926 births
2006 deaths
People from Hove
British writers